Xiaying Township (Mandarin: 下营藏族乡) is a township in Ledu District, Haidong, Qinghai, China. In 2010, Xiaying Township had a total population of 3,635: 1,881 males and 1,754 females: 692 aged under 14, 2,533 aged between 15 and 65 and 410 aged over 65.

References 
 

Haidong
Township-level divisions of Qinghai
Ethnic townships of the People's Republic of China